Grover Klemmer, Jr. (March 16, 1921 – August 23, 2015) was an American athlete.  While running for the University of California, he lettered in American football, basketball and track and field.  He was called the "golden boy" for the Golden Bears.  In 1941, he set the world record for the 400 metres, running 46.0 around a single turn at the University of Pennsylvania Franklin Field on June 29, 1941.  Two weeks earlier, he anchored the Bears mile relay team to a world record in 3:09.4, edging out the University of Southern California team anchored by Hubie Kerns (who also was second in Philadelphia) by reportedly 4 inches (10 cm).  Five minutes later, he was informed of the death of his father, Grover Klemmer, Sr. earlier that day.

Klemmer was the USA National Champion at 440 yards in 1940 at age 19 and again in 1941, representing the San Francisco Olympic Club.

Later, he was an official in the National Football League from 1963 through 1981, working mainly as a back judge and side judge, wearing uniform number 8.

References

1921 births
2015 deaths
American male sprinters
California Golden Bears football players
California Golden Bears men's basketball players
California Golden Bears men's track and field athletes
World record setters in athletics (track and field)
Great Lakes Navy Bluejackets football players
National Football League officials
Sportspeople from the San Francisco Bay Area
Track and field athletes from California
American men's basketball players